John McBride (1854 – October 9, 1917) was an American labor union leader.

McBride was born in Wayne County, Ohio, in 1854. He started working in the coal mines at the age of nine. In 1870, McBride joined the Ohio Miners' Union, and in 1883 he became its president, a post that he retained until 1889. After serving briefly in the Ohio legislature as a Democrat from 1884 to 1888, McBride helped found the Ohio People’s Party in 1891. In 1892, McBride was elected president of the United Mine Workers.

McBride's prominence continued to rise with the growth of the Populist Movement in the American Midwest, and in 1894, McBride unseated labor icon Samuel Gompers as president of the American Federation of Labor. Not long after assuming the office, however, McBride became embroiled in conflicts with other union leaders and his popularity declined. Gompers regained the presidency the following year.

McBride was standing on a street corner in Globe, Arizona, when a runaway horse knocked him through a plate glass window, causing severe lacerations in his leg, a severed artery, great loss of blood, and death.

References

1854 births
1917 deaths
American trade union leaders
American trade unionists of Irish descent
Presidents of the United Mine Workers
American Federation of Labor people
People from Wayne County, Ohio
Ohio Populists
Trade unionists from Ohio